William Robert Meacock (26 July 1910 – after 1946) was an English professional footballer who made 180 appearances in the Football League playing for Torquay United, Tranmere Rovers, Lincoln City and Birmingham. He played most frequently at centre half, but also appeared as a right half or inside right.

Meacock was born in Hoole, Cheshire. He played for local club Hoole & Newton, and was on the books of Chester and Blackpool, before joining Torquay United in 1931, where he made his debut in the Football League. He went on to play regular first-team football in the Third Division North for Tranmere Rovers, where he was part of the Tranmere side which reached the Welsh Cup final in 1934, and Lincoln City, for whom he made 116 appearances in all competitions. Meacock then moved to First Division club Birmingham as one of a number of players signed in 1938 to "boost the club's flagging fortunes". He played 14 games in all competitions, but left at the end of the 1938–39 season with the club relegated. He joined Bristol City, but the outbreak of the Second World War put an end to his professional career.

In 1946 Meacock was appointed as coach in the Netherlands at Racing Club Haarlem (RCH).

References

External links
Meacock's profile and photograph at the Lincoln City FC Archive

1910 births
Year of death missing
People from Cheshire
English footballers
Association football defenders
Chester City F.C. players
Blackpool F.C. players
Torquay United F.C. players
Tranmere Rovers F.C. players
Lincoln City F.C. players
Birmingham City F.C. players
Bristol City F.C. players
English Football League players
Place of death missing